Ethnicity is the eleventh studio album by Yanni, released on February 11, 2003 by Virgin Records. It peaked at #27 on Billboard's "Top Internet Albums" chart and at #27 on the "Billboard 200" chart in 2003.  It also peaked at #1 on the "Top New Age Albums" chart in 2004.

Background
Ethnicity features greater use of vocals, percussion, and exotic rhythms, which were influenced by Yanni's period of travel during his hiatus between 1998 and 2000. As Yanni is unable to read music, he wrote and recorded demos of the album's tracks at his home studio in Florida, after which he employed transcribers and copyists to write the individual parts for the session musicians.

Reception

Backroads Music/Heartbeats wrote that the album was musically quite diverse, stating that "Though Yanni is widely known as one of the most popular purveyors of New-age music, there's actually quite a bit going on here."

Track listing

Personnel
Music
All music composed and arranged by Yanni.  (except "Jivaeri")
Pedro Eustache – Flutes, World Reeds, Duduk, Argul, Uilleann pipes, Chanter, and Saxophone.
Karen Briggs – Violin

Vocals
Alfreda Gerald (also lead vocals on "The Promise", "Tribal Dream", and "Never Too Late")
Michelle Amato (also lead vocals on "For All Seasons", "Almost a Whisper", and "Jivaeri") 
Yanni (also lead vocals on "Never Too Late")
Noelani Brock (also lead vocals on "Written on the Wind")  
Regina Acuna-Williams
Peter Lehman
Randy Nichols
Suzy Park
Kurt von Schmittou

Lyrics
Lyrics for "The Promise" and "Almost a Whisper" by Pamela McNeill.

Production
Engineered and mixed by Yanni at his private studios.
Assistant engineer: Anthony Stabile
Mastered by Chris Bellman at Bernie Grundman Mastering, Hollywood, California.
Recorded and mixed on a Soundtracs DPC-II Digital Console
All piano tracks were recorded on a Yamaha CFIII 5, 9' Concert Grand

The Ethnicity concert tour

Set List

Featured tour musicians

Tour Production
Personal Management:  Danny O'Donovan, Danny O'Donovan Entertainment Group
Business Management:  Seven Eight, Inc., Tom Paske, George Veras, Diane Kramer, Anda Allenson, Richard Allenson
Tour & Production Manager:  Michael Weiss
Production Supervisor:  Anthony Stabile
Personal Assistant to Yanni:  Don Bath
Road Manager:  Craig Yun
Stage Manager:  Richard Bray
Production Coordinator:  Kathleen Kronauer
Tour Accountant:  Richard Allenson
Tour Security:  Jason Temke
Lighting Director:  Bud Horowitz
Yanni's wardrobe designed by Nolan Miller
Costume Design/Wardrobe:  Jennifer Jacobs, Thomas Wells

Tour dates

Certifications and sales

References

External links
Official Website

Yanni albums
2003 albums
Yanni concert tours